For the Winter Olympics, there are six venues starting with the letter 'H', five venues starting with the letter 'I', three venues starting with the letter 'J', and ten venues starting with the letter 'K'.

H

I

J

K

References